Katharine G. Abraham (born August 28, 1954) is an American economist who is the director of the Maryland Center for Economics and Policy, and a professor of survey methodology and economics at the University of Maryland. She was commissioner of the Bureau of Labor Statistics from 1993–2001 and a member of the Council of Economic Advisers from 2011–2013. She was elected a member of the National Academy of Sciences in 2022.

Education
Abraham holds a bachelor of science degree in economics from Iowa State University (1976) and a Ph.D. in economics from Harvard University (1982). She was an assistant professor at MIT's Sloan School of Management and a research associate at the Brookings Institution before joining the faculty at the University of Maryland in 1988.

Career
During her time as commissioner of the Bureau of Labor Statistics, Abraham laid the groundwork for the American Time Use Survey, the first U.S. government survey of time use, and established the Federal Economic Statistics Advisory Committee. During extensive public debate on the Consumer Price Index in the 1990s, Abraham testified repeatedly before Congress on the shortcomings of existing methodology and the necessity of making revisions based on objective research. She expanded coverage of the prices of services in the Producer Price Index; instituted improvements in the Current Employment Statistics, including the substitution of a probability sample for the quota sample; accelerated delivery of employment and wage statistics; and took steps toward expanding coverage of wages and salaries in the Occupational Employment Statistics program.

Abraham's research has included studies of the effects of job duration on wages; the effects of advertising on job vacancies, wages and the business cycle; and comparisons among the U.S., European, and Japanese labor markets; work-sharing policies, unemployment, and job openings; the operation of internal labor markets; and the measurement of market and nonmarket economic activity.

Awards
She is a research associate of the National Bureau of Economic Research and the recipient of an honorary doctorate by Iowa State University. She has been awarded the Julius Shiskin Award for Economic Statistics (2002), the Roger Herriot Award for Innovation in Federal Statistics (2010), the Susan C. Eaton Scholar-Practitioner Award of the Labor and Employment Relations Association (2013), and was named a Distinguished Fellow of the American Economic Association in 2020. She is a fellow of the American Statistical Association and the Society of Labor Economists. She was elected to fellowship of the American Academy of Arts and Sciences in 2020.

Selected bibliography
Books
  Based on papers presented at a conference held at MIT in June 1987.
 
 
 

Journal articles
 
 
 
 
 
 
 
  Pdf.
 Working papers and National Bureau of Economic Research (NBER) papers.

References

American women economists
Economists from Iowa
Feminist economists
20th-century American economists
21st-century American economists
Bureau of Labor Statistics
United States Department of Labor officials
Obama administration personnel
Clinton administration personnel
American civil servants
MIT Sloan School of Management faculty
University of Maryland, College Park faculty
Fellows of the American Statistical Association
Harvard Graduate School of Arts and Sciences alumni
Labor economists
Iowa State University alumni
People from Ames, Iowa
Living people
1954 births
United States Council of Economic Advisers
Fellows of the American Academy of Arts and Sciences
21st-century American women
Members of the United States National Academy of Sciences